Cheyenne Warrior is a 1994 American Western television film written by Michael B. Druxman, directed by Mark Griffiths, and stars Kelly Preston, Dan Haggerty and Pato Hoffmann. The film follows the struggle of a widowed, pregnant woman who is stranded at a trading post during the American Civil War.

Plot summary 
As war brews between the Union and the Confederate States of America, Matthew and Rebecca travel to the west to start a new life in Oregon. Along the way, they stop at a remote trading post, where they meet up with some Cheyenne Indians. Though the Cheyenne are friendly toward the pioneers, Matthew does not like them and warns a group of hunters that hostile Indians are preparing for an attack. In the confrontation that results, only a pregnant Rebecca and a single wounded Cheyenne warrior named Hawk are left alive. As the winter closes in, and the two are forced to rely on each other for survival, they begin to fall in love.

Cast
 Kelly Preston as Rebecca Carver
 Pato Hoffmann as Hawk
 Bo Hopkins as Jack Andrews
 Dan Haggerty as Barkley
 Clint Howard as Otto Nielsen
 Rick Dean as Daniel Kearney
 Charles Edwin Powell as Matthew Carver
 Noah Colton as Matthew Carver, Jr.
 Louise Baker as Pioneer Woman
 Nik Winterhawk as Tall Elk
 Patricia Van Ingen as Crow Woman
 Frankie Avina as Crazy Buffalo
 Joseph Wolves Kill as Running Wolf
 Terrance Fredricks as Little Rabbit
 Mark S. Brien as Spotted Face
 Mark Cota as  Yellow Moccasin
 Jules Desjarlais as  Warrior
 Danny Lee Clark as  Red Knife
 Jesse James Youngblood as Owl Eyes
 Ezra Gabey as Iron Bear
 Lewis Ninham as Mole on Face

References

External links
 

1994 television films
1994 films
American Civil War films
1994 Western (genre) films
Films about interracial romance
Films about Native Americans
American Western (genre) television films
Films directed by Mark Griffiths (director)
1990s English-language films
1990s American films